Rhodacanthis is an extinct genus of Hawaiian honeycreepers commonly known as koa finches. All four species were endemic to the Hawaiian Islands. Members of this genus were granivores, with bills adapted to the seeds and pods of legumes. The two species that became extinct in the 1890s, R. flaviceps and R. palmeri, inhabited upper elevation mesic forests dominated by koa (Acacia koa) on the island of Hawaii. The combination of a giant bill with brightly colored plumage (yellow for R. flaviceps, orange for R. palmeri) gave the males a very striking appearance. Koa seeds were the preferred food for the two species, but caterpillars were taken if necessary. The two prehistoric species, R. forfex and R. litotes, were denizens of more lowland tropical dry forests and shrublands on Kauai, Maui, and Oahu. It is speculated that koaia (Acacia koaia) was an important food source for both species, as their range did not overlap with that of koa. Kanaloa (Kanaloa spp.) pods and aalii (Dodonaea viscosa) berries  were probably also eaten in addition to the occasional caterpillar.

Species
Rhodacanthis flaviceps Rothschild, 1892 – lesser koa finch (extinct, 1891)
Rhodacanthis forfex James & Olson, 2005 – scissor-billed koa finch (prehistoric)
Rhodacanthis litotes James & Olson, 2005 – primitive koa finch (prehistoric)
Rhodacanthis palmeri Rothschild, 1892 – greater koa finch (extinct, 1896)

See also

References

 
Hawaiian honeycreepers
Endemic fauna of Hawaii
Extinct birds of Hawaii
Bird extinctions since 1500
Bird genera
Carduelinae
Higher-level bird taxa restricted to the Australasia-Pacific region
Holocene extinctions
Taxonomy articles created by Polbot